Ben Abdan (also Romanized as Ben Ābdān, Bon Ābdān, and Bonābdān; also known as Benāh Bedān) is a village in Dehsard Rural District, in the Central District of Arzuiyeh County, Kerman Province, Iran. At the 2006 census, its population was 114, in 39 families.

References 

Populated places in Arzuiyeh County